The 2000 All-Ireland Senior Football Championship Final was the 113th All-Ireland Final and the deciding match of the 2000 All-Ireland Senior Football Championship, an inter-county Gaelic football tournament for the top teams in Ireland.

Kerry defeated Galway after a replay. There was controversy over the decision to hold the replay on a Saturday, instead of the usual Sunday. Since then games on days other than Sundays have become commonplace. Kerry ultimately triumphed over Galway by a scoreline of 0–17 to 1–10.

Match 1

Summary
Kerry played Galway on Sunday (24 September 2000) in Croke Park, Dublin in the All-Ireland Senior Football Championship title. The two teams had previously played against one another in Croke Park in an All-Ireland Final in 1965 where Galway won, the 2000 final ended in a draw. Galway trailed for most of the game and it wasn't until three minutes from the end that they levelled the game after working tirelessly throughout to reduce the deficit. At one point Galway were behind Kerry by seven points in the first half of the game. The final score was 0–14 points each. It was the first time since the 1992 All-Ireland Final that both sides failed to score a goal.

Pádraic Joyce brought the sides level with four minutes remaining.

The referee played 40 seconds of additional time.

Details

Match 2

Summary
The replay of the 2000 All-Ireland Senior Football Final took place in Croke Park on Saturday, 7 October at 4:00pm. It was the first time since 1996 that the decider went to a replay. It wasn't the disjointed game of the 24th, that was replayed on the hallowed turf of Croke Park amidst the chants and jeers of the 64,000 strong crowd, rather a close, man-marked, point-for-point contest, that the pundits had predicted preceding the first game. The first half was a paradox of brilliant football and wide shooting. Declan Meehan broke through Kerry's defense, in the 6th minute, to score one of the best goals of the championship. Galway's one point lead boded ominous for Kerry but they rallied and began to pick their points amidst a shower of wides. The most definitive injury of the half was that of Kevin Walsh who had to be replaced by Joe Bergin. The occasion once again got to young Bergin as he didn't exert a major influence in the middle of the field and this led to Kerry's domination of this area especially after Maurice Fitzgerald replaced Noel Kennelly in the 27th minute and played as a third midfielder.  As the team broke for half-time the score was 0–09 to 1–04 in favour of Kerry. A light drizzle fell in the second half. Fitzgerald settled into his position with the professional role familiar to all from the 97 season. Kevin Walsh was re-introduced for mid-fielder Sean O'Domhnaill to combat Fitzgearld's influence but he never played as dominant a part in the game as he had prior to his earlier injury and indeed the drawn game. The deteriorating pitch surface took its toll as players began to slip and slide along the Cusack sideline but with minutes left to play Kerry had opened their lead to 4 points and it stayed that way at the end.

Aodán Mac Gearailt fisted the insurance point over the bar in the 2000 replay.

Details

References

All-Ireland Senior Football Championship Final
All-Ireland Senior Football Championship Final, 2000
All-Ireland Senior Football Championship Finals
All-Ireland Senior Football Championship Finals
Galway county football team matches
Kerry county football team matches